Petals for Armor is the debut solo studio album by American singer-songwriter Hayley Williams. It was released on May 8, 2020, by Atlantic Records. The album was preceded by two extended plays (EPs), Petals for Armor I and Petals for Armor II, which make up the album's first ten songs.

Williams explained the inspiration behind the title of the album is due to her belief that "the best way for me to protect myself is to be vulnerable." The album was produced by Williams' Paramore bandmate Taylor York and was written throughout 2019 during Paramore's hiatus after touring in support of their fifth studio album, After Laughter (2017).

The album was supported by its lead single, "Simmer", which was released in January 2020, accompanied with its music video. In an interview with BBC Radio, Williams confirmed that she will tour in support of Petals for Armor following its release.

Background
Following extensive touring in support of Paramore's fifth studio album After Laughter (2017), Hayley Williams expressed her feelings about the group's future moving forward explaining that they were not breaking up, however needed time away from writing and touring. In an interview with BBC Radio, in January 2020, Williams explained her process behind developing the album.

Promotion and release

Singles
In December 2019, Williams announced on her birthday that she would be releasing a "taste" of new solo music in January 2020. Williams revealed the song title on social media on January 20, 2020, after posting various teasers over the course of January which featured a "dark aesthetic", with one including a person running through the woods. On January 22, 2020, Hayley Williams released  the lead single "Simmer", the song was written by Williams, Paramore touring musician Joseph Howard, and guitarist Taylor York.

The album's second single, "Dead Horse", was released on April 21, 2020. "'Dead Horse' offers strength back to a younger, weaker version of myself," Williams continues. "I feel like all of this needed to be said in order to embody the kind of woman I hope to be." The music video was released on May 8. It was directed by Zac Farro.

Promotional singles

Singles for Petals for Armor I

"Leave It Alone" was released on January 30, 2020 by Atlantic Records for digital download and to streaming platforms and serves as the second single for Williams' debut solo EP, Petals for Armor I. The song was written by Williams and Joseph Howard and was produced by Taylor York. The music video for "Leave It Alone" was directed by Warren Fu and serves as a sequel to its predecessor "Simmer". It premiered on the same day as the single's release. Another music video, "Leave It Alone Interlude", premiered on February 3, 2020.

"Cinnamon" was released on February 6, 2020 as a third single from her Petals for Armor I project along with the EP's release. The music video for "Cinnamon" was directed by Warren Fu and serves as a sequel to its predecessor "Leave It Alone".

Singles for Petals for Armor II

"Roses/Lotus/Violet/Iris" was released on March 19, 2020 with an official lyric video. The song features indie rock band Boygenius, which consists of Julien Baker, Phoebe Bridgers, and Lucy Dacus, on background vocals. Williams said about the single in her Twitter account.
 Williams also released the songs "Over Yet", "My Friend" and "Why We Ever".

Canceled Tour

Planned to take place alongside the release of album, on March 5, 2020 Williams announced the European and North American legs of the Petals for Armor Tour, set to start in May 13 in Amsterdam, Netherlands and conclude on June 29, 2020 in Nashville, United States.
The pre-sale started on March 13, 2020. It was announced that the support acts would be English R&B artist Arlo Parks on the North American leg and Scottish band the Ninth Wave in Europe. However, in August 2020 Williams announced that the tour was canceled  due to the COVID-19 pandemic and that there were "no immediate plans to schedule new dates".

Cancelled shows

Critical reception

Petals for Armor was met with critical acclaim. At Metacritic, which assigns a normalized rating out of 100 to reviews from professional publications, the album received an average score of 83, based on 22 reviews, indicating "universal acclaim". Aggregator AnyDecentMusic? gave it 8.1 out of 10, based on their assessment of the critical consensus.

Track listing

Notes
"Crystal Clear" contains music from "Friends or Lovers" by Rusty Williams.

Credits and personnel
Credits adapted from liner notes.

Musicians
 Hayley Williams – vocals; guitar (tracks: 1, 3, and 4); keyboards (tracks: 1, 3, 4, 7, 8, 10–13, and 15); drums (track: 3)
 Aaron Steele – drums (tracks: 1–12); programming (track: 1); congas (tracks: 2, 9, and 11); percussion (tracks: 2 and 9)
 Joey Howard – bass (tracks: 1–12, and 15); keyboards (tracks: 1, 2, 4, 5, 7, 9, 11, and 12); percussion (track: 2); guitar (track: 4); programming (tracks: 5 and 7)
 Taylor York – additional instrumentation (all tracks)
 Daniel James – string arrangements (tracks: 2 and 9)
 Benjamin Kaufman – violin (tracks: 2 and 9); chin cello (tracks: 2 and 9)
 Steph Marziano – keyboards (tracks: 4 and 8); programming (tracks: 4 and 8)
 Mike Weiss – guitar (track: 4)
 Julien Baker – background vocals (track: 9)
 Phoebe Bridgers – background vocals (track: 9)
 Lucy Dacus – background vocals (track: 9)
 Zac Farro - drums (tracks: 14 and 15)
 Brian Robert Jones – bass (track: 14)
 Rusty Williams – vocals (track: 15); piano (track: 15)

Producers and engineers
 Taylor York – production
 Carlos de la Garza – mixing, engineering, additional production (tracks: 8, 11, 12, 14, and 15)
 Dave Cooley – mastering
 Michael Craver – mixing assistance, studio assistance
 David Fitzgibbons – mixing assistance, studio assistance
 Kevin Boettger – studio assistance
 Michelle Freetly – studio assistance
 Jake Butler – studio assistance
 Steph Marziano – additional production (tracks: 4 and 8)
 Daniel James – additional production (tracks: 4–6, 8, 9, and 14)
 Joey Howard – additional production (track: 7)
 Micah Tawlks – additional production (track: 10); engineering (track: 10)

Artwork
 Lindsey Byrnes – creative direction, photography
 Alex Mata – design, layout

Charts

Petals for Armor: Self-Serenades

Petals for Armor: Self-Serenades is an extended play (EP) containing acoustic versions of two songs from Petals for Armor, and one new song. It was released on Atlantic Records on December 18, 2020.

A studio version of "Find Me Here" appears as the twelfth track on Williams' second album, Flowers for Vases / Descansos.

Background
The EP was entirely a home recording on a 4-track recorder. Williams played alone on the EP, with Williams on vocals and acoustic guitar. Williams cites "Find Me Here" as one of her favorite songs she wrote in 2020.

Track listing

Credits and personnel
Credits adapted from liner notes.

Musicians
 Hayley Williams – primary artist, vocals, acoustic guitar

Additional personnel
 Daniel James – production, mixing, engineering
 Dave Cooley – mastering

See also
List of 2020 albums

Notes

References

2020 debut albums
Hayley Williams albums
Albums produced by Taylor York
Atlantic Records albums
Art pop albums
Experimental pop albums
Indie pop albums by American artists
Synth-pop albums by American artists